Mark Spencer is a British forensic botanist and botanical consultant. He also monitors the changing composition of urban wildlife. He is the honorary botany curator for the Linnean Society of London.

Early life
Spencer was born in the 1970s. He became enthusiastic about plants as a child, especially plant identification and growth habits. He was brought up in the rural setting of Warmington, Warwickshire and his family supported this interest. He disliked secondary school due to attacks and extensive bullying related to his strong opinions and homosexuality and left with few qualifications.

In the 1990s Spencer worked in bars in Soho in London and was involved in HIV/AIDS activism around Section 28 as well as the AIDS pandemic.

Botanical education and career
He took a BSc degree in botany at the University of Reading in his late 20s followed by a PhD specialising in Oomycete aquatic fungi supervised by Michael Dick. He subsequently worked in the Natural History Museum, London as a research assistant and then botany curator. This led him to plant taxonomy and systematics. Spencer is also involved in recording the natural history of the urban environment of London, especially the arrival of new species, often through the international horticultural trade.

From around 2009 he has worked as a consultant forensic botanist. This started from a chance phone enquiry from the police. Spencer uses both field and laboratory methods to analyse features such as plant growth habit and microscopic fragments. He has found that observation of the growth of plants such as brambles (Rubus fruticosus) can be very informative for estimating the time elapsed since a human body came to rest in woodland or hedgerows.

Spencer is a Fellow of the Linnean Society of London and honorary curator of the society's herbariums.

In March 2021 he was the guest on an episode of the BBC Radio 4 programme The Life Scientific.

Publications
Spencer is the author of the  book Murder Most Florid: inside the mind of a forensic botanist published in 2019.

He is also co-author of over 10 scientific publications including:
 Chris A. Skilbeck, Iris Lynch, Maggie Ellenby, Mark A. Spencer (2019) Achene Morphology of British and Irish Mayweeds and Chamomiles: implications for taxonomy and identification British and Irish Botany 1 (2) 128-166
  Kenneth G. Johnson, Stephen J. Brooks, Phillip B. Fenberg, Adrian G. Glover, Karen E. James, Adrian M. Lister, Ellinor Michel, Mark Spencer, Jonathan A. Todd, Eugenia Valsami-Jones, Jeremy R. Young, John R. Stewart (2011) Climate Change and Biosphere Response: Unlocking the Collections Vault. BioScience 61 (2) 147-153 
 Mark A. Spencer, Linda M. Irvine, Charles E. Jarvis (2009) Typification of Linnaean names relevant to algal nomenclature Taxon
MA Spencer, MC Vick, MW Dick (2002) Revision of Aplanopsis, Pythiopsis, and ‘subcentric’ Achlya species (Saprolegniaceae) using 18S rDNA and morphological data Mycological Research 106 (5) 549-560

References

Living people
British LGBT scientists
British botanists
British forensic scientists
Alumni of the University of Reading
People from Warwickshire
Year of birth missing (living people)